Anders Andersen-Lundby (December 16, 1841 – January 4, 1923) was a Danish landscape painter. He was most associated with  winter landscapes.

Biography
Anders Andersen-Lundby  was born in Lundby, Denmark. He grew up in Lundby near Aalborg. In 1861, when he was twenty, Andersen-Lundby traveled  to Copenhagen, and there he exhibited his works for the first time in 1864.  By 1870, he gained popularity especially with his winter landscapes from both Denmark and southern Germany, most often with fallen snow or thaw.

In 1876, he moved to Munich with his family where he exhibited his paintings. He frequently visited Denmark and participated in exhibitions there. He exhibited at the Charlottenborg Spring Exhibition  1864–1913.

Personal life
In 1865, he married Thora Adelheid Børgesen (1842–1911). He died in Munich in 1923.

Gallery

References 

19th-century Danish painters
Danish male painters
20th-century Danish painters
Danish emigrants to Germany
People from Aalborg Municipality
1841 births
1923 deaths
19th-century Danish male artists
20th-century Danish male artists